James Buchanan Bourque (born July 9, 1993) is an American professional baseball pitcher who is a free agent. He has played in Major League Baseball (MLB) for the Washington Nationals.

Career

Washington Nationals
Bourque attended Huron High School in Ann Arbor, Michigan and played college baseball at the University of Michigan. He was drafted by the Washington Nationals in the 14th round of the 2014 Major League Baseball draft. He spent his first professional season with the Gulf Coast Nationals and Auburn Doubledays.

Bourque missed the 2015 season after undergoing Tommy John surgery. Prior to the 2018 season, the Nationals converted him from a starter into a relief pitcher. Bourque turned in a 1.70 ERA between the Class-A Advanced Potomac Nationals and Class-AA Harrisburg Senators, working exclusively in relief, and rocketed up the prospect charts to be ranked as the Nationals' 17th-best prospect by MLB.com midway through the 2018 season. The Nationals added him to their 40-man roster after the 2018 season.

After Bourque pitched to a 1.33 ERA through 14 games with Class-AA Harrisburg, the Nationals called him up on May 25, 2019, to replace Joe Ross in the bullpen. He made his major league debut the following game, pitching in the ninth inning against the Miami Marlins.

On May 29, 2019, Bourque was optioned to the Triple-A Fresno Grizzlies and spent the rest of the season there, going 4–1 with a 5.56 ERA over 43.2 innings.

Bourque was outrighted off of the 40-man roster on October 13, 2020. He became a free agent on November 2, 2020.

Chicago Cubs
On December 18, 2020, Bourque signed a minor league contract with the Chicago Cubs organization. On November 10, 2022, Bourque elected free agency.

References

External links

1993 births
Living people
Baseball players from Ann Arbor, Michigan
Major League Baseball pitchers
Washington Nationals players
Michigan Wolverines baseball players
Gulf Coast Nationals players
Auburn Doubledays players
Hagerstown Suns players
Potomac Nationals players
Harrisburg Senators players
Fresno Grizzlies players